Douglas James Becker (born June 27, 1956) is a former American football linebacker who played a single season in the National Football League (NFL) for the Chicago Bears and Buffalo Bills.

Early life
Becker was born in Hamilton, Ohio and he attended the University of Notre Dame in South Bend, Indiana where he played college football.

Football career
Becker was drafted in the 10th round of the 1978 NFL Draft by the Pittsburgh Steelers. Becker was among the final group of players waived by the Steelers in getting down to the 45-man roster limit. He was claimed off waivers by the Chicago Bears. After appearing in the Bears' season opener he was cut by the team. He was later picked up by the Buffalo Bills with whom he played the final eight games of the 1978 campaign.

Work career
Doug Becker was the VP of Sales at RC Cola in Evansville, IN (local, family owned, beverage bottler) for 4 years.  His "football" and "team like" mentality allowed him to excel greatly as a leader at RC Cola. Doug retired from RC Cola in 2015 to move back to his hometown and spend time with his new Grandbaby.

References

1956 births
Living people
American football linebackers
Chicago Bears players
Buffalo Bills players
Notre Dame Fighting Irish football players
Sportspeople from Hamilton, Ohio
Players of American football from Ohio